Bob Ballinger (born January 31, 1974) is an American attorney and politician. He served in the Arkansas General Assembly from 2013 to 2023.

Early life and education 
Ballinger was born in Bremerton, Washington and raised in Tulsa, Oklahoma. He earned a Bachelor of Arts degree in social studies from Northeastern State University in 1998 and a Juris Doctor from University of Arkansas School of Law in 2005.

Career 
From 1999 to 2002, Ballinger worked as a teacher and coach for the Sapulpa Public Schools in Sapulpa, Oklahoma. Since 2006, he has operated an independent legal practice. He served as a member of the Arkansas House of Representatives from 2013 to 2019. He was then elected to the Arkansas Senate. During the 2017 legislative session, Ballinger served as chair of the House State Agencies and Governmental Affairs Committee. He serves as co-chair of the Senate Joint Energy Committee.

In 2017, Ballinger drafted a proposal that would make it a crime for people to knowingly expose their sex organs to someone of the opposite sex in a public place under circumstances likely to cause alarm. The proposal was criticized as a plan to prevent transgender people to use bathrooms corresponding with their gender identity.

Ballinger stood for re-election in 2022 for the Arkansas Senate 28th district, which had recently been renumbered due to redistricting. He was challenged in the May 24, 2022 Republican primary by Bryan King, who he had primaried in 2019, Keith Slape, Bob Largent, and Theodore (Ted) Walker. With any candidate failing to win over 50%, a runoff election was set between the top two vote recipients, Ballinger and King. In what was described as the "highest-profile state Senate runoff", King defeated Ballinger 3,604 to 2,917.

References 

Living people
Arkansas lawyers
Northeastern State University alumni
University of Arkansas School of Law alumni
People from Ozark, Arkansas
Republican Party members of the Arkansas House of Representatives
Republican Party Arkansas state senators
1974 births
People from Bremerton, Washington
People from Tulsa, Oklahoma